Anneli Burman (born 13 March 1963) is a Swedish curler. She is a 1983 Swedish women's champion and three-time Swedish mixed champion (1987, 1989, 1990).

Teams

Women's

Mixed

Personal life

References

External links
 

Living people
1963 births
Swedish female curlers
Swedish curling champions